Lutz-Michael Harder (4 September 1942 – 24 August 2019) was a German lyric tenor known mostly for his interpretation of Mozart opera roles and as a baroque concert soloist. He was also an academic voice teacher at the Musikhochschule Hannover.

Life 
He became a member of the Oldenburgisches Staatstheater for a year and then was member of the Staatsoper Hannover for several years. In 1978, he sang Don Ottavio in Mozart's Don Giovanni at the Ludwigsburg Festival. In 1985, he starred as Hans Scholl in the world premiere of the second version of Udo Zimmermann's Weiße Rose at the Hamburg State Opera, a role which he reprised and recorded two years later at the Vienna State Opera. He went on to perform several roles in major houses throughout Germany, Austria, and Switzerland appearing mainly in the works of Mozart.

Harder also had a prolific concert singing career, particularly as a Bach interpreter. In addition to recording Hans Scholl, Harder has recorded the role of Don Ottavio in Don Giovanni, the title role in Karl Martin Reinthaler's Jephtha, and several Bach cantatas, among others.

Harder lectured from 1982 at the Musikhochschule Hannover, where he was appointed professor of voice on 15 March 1989. He taught there for 25 years.

References

External links 
 
 
 
 Lutz-Michael Harder (Tenor) Bach Cantatas Website
 Prof. Lutz-Michael Harder hmtm-hannover.de
 Abschied mit Herzblut und Meisterhand bergedorfer-zeitung.de 2015
 Cäcilienverein / Sonntag 20. Dezember 1981 / 16:00, Großer Saal alteoper.de
 Alan Blyth: Choral Music on Record

German operatic tenors
1942 births
2019 deaths
20th-century German male  opera singers
People from Posen-West Prussia
Academic staff of the Hochschule für Musik, Theater und Medien Hannover